This list of preserved steam locomotives in Germany makes no claim to being complete. While there are many surviving examples of several locomotive classes, some are in a very poor condition. Thus the list includes partly dismantled or badly corroded locomotives, the technical condition of which cannot really be accurately conveyed in their descriptions.

In many cases the names of organisations, societies and museums have been translated in line with Wikipedia practice. However where they have a standard abbreviation in German, this has been retained. For example, the German Railway History Company (Deutsche Gesellschaft für Eisenbahngeschichte) is abbreviated to DGEG, its normal (German) abbreviation. In either case the link leads to the English Wikipedia article where both English and German names are given. In addition the following common German abbreviations are used:

 AW  = Ausbesserungswerk = repair shop
 BW  = Bahnbetriebswerk  = locomotive depot
 EM  = Eisenbahnmuseum   = railway museum
 RAW = Reichsbahnausbesserungswerk = Reichsbahn repair shop

Special locomotives 

Replicas of historic engines, that cannot be grouped into a specific class.

Locomotives that can be grouped into the classification scheme

Class 01

Class 01.0–2 
The Class 01 locomotives were the first production series standard express train locomotives in the Deutsche Reichsbahn. They were of the 4-6-2 or Pacific type.

Class 01.5 
The Class 01.5 were reconstructed DRG Class 01 express locomotives (Rekoloks) reclassified by the Deutsche Reichsbahn in the GDR.

Class 01.10 
The Class 01.10 were standard express train locomotives with the Deutsche Reichsbahn. The Class 01.10 was an evolutionary development of Class 01 with 3 cylinders and streamlining. On the introduction of computerised (EDP) numbers, the coal-fired locomotives were renumbered to the 011 series and the oil-fired versions to 012.

Class 03 

The Class 03 engines were built between 1930 and 1937 as express locomotives for routes that were only suitable for axle loads up to 18 tonnes.

Class 03.0-2 
The low weight of this locomotive, which was based on the DRG Class 01, was achieved by using a light bar frame, smaller boiler and smaller cylinders. From running number 03 123 the pumps were located in the middle of the vehicle and from number 03 163 the locomotives had larger leading wheels. All locomotives had 2 cylinders.

Class 03.10 
The Class 03.10 was an evolutionary development of the Class 03, comparable to the locomotives of Class 01.10,which were derived from Class 01. Class 03.10 were three-cylinder locomotives equipped with full streamlining on delivering.

Class 05 
Class 05 locomotives were standard express train locomotives of the Deutsche Reichsbahn with full streamlining. Three engines were built, number 05 002 achieved a world speed record for rail vehicles at over 200 km/h.

Class 10 

The Class 10 were express locomotives and the last class of steam locomotives built by the Deutsche Bundesbahn. They were intended to replace the Class 01 and 01.10s. Only 2 units were built.

Class 15 

Before 1925, the Class 15 engine was classified as S 2/6 with the Royal Bavarian State Railways. This 4-4-4 locomotive was specially designed in 1906 as a one-off for express train testing.

Class 17 
Class 17 was assigned to 4-6-0 Express passenger locomotives of the various Länderbahnen (state railways)

Class 17.0
The Deutsche Reichsbahn grouped 2 very similar state railway express locomotive classes into DRG Class 17.0-1: nos. 17 001 – 17 135 (the Prussian S 10) and nos. 17 141 – 17 143 (the LBE S 10)

Class 17.10 
Class 17.10 was assigned to the Prussian S 101.

Class 18 

The Deutsche Reichsbahn grouped those express train, tender locomotives with an axle arrangement of 2'C1' (Pacific), taken over from the state railways, into Class 18. In addition, locomotive number 18 201 is also included in this class. The remaining locomotives in the Deutsche Reichsbahn of the GDR incorporated into Class 02 on the change-over to computerised numbers.

Class 18.3 
The class IV h locomotives of the Grand Duchy of Baden State Railway (Deutsche Reichsbahn Class 18.3) are express locomotives with an axle arrangement of 2'C1' (Pacific).

Class 18.4–5 
The steam locomotives of Bavarian class S 3/6, DRG Class 18.4–5, were express locomotives with the axle arrangement 4-6-2 (Pacific).

Class 18.6 (DB) 
In the 1950s the Deutsche Bundesbahn carried out a modernisation of much of its locomotive fleet. This included the conversion of 30 examples of Class 18.5 by the firms of Krauss-Maffei and Henschel. This involved the Reichsbahn locomotives procured roughly between 1927 and 1930 of Bavarian S 3/6 series l to o, that were reclassified into DB Class 18.6.

18 201 
Locomotive number 18 201 of the Deutsche Reichsbahn (GDR) emerged in 1961 at the Reichsbahnausbesserungswerk Meiningen as a conversion of the Henschel-Wegmann train locomotive, number 61 002, the tender of 44 468 and parts of H 45 024.

Class 19 

The DRG Class 19 were eight-coupled express train tender locomotives with a 1′D1′ axle arrangement taken over from the Royal Saxon State Railways.

Class 22 

The Class 22 were passenger train locomotives with the Deutsche Reichsbahn in East Germany, that were converted from former 39.0-2 engines between 1958 and 1962, as part of the reconstruction programme and were renumbered in 1970 under the new computer-generated numbering scheme back to Class 39.10. Several Class 22 boilers were also reused for Class 03.10 locomotives.

Class 23 
The DRG had two examples of the DRG Class 23 Einheitslokomotive built, but it was not until after the Second World War that it went into series production with an improved design as the DB Class 23 and DR Class 23.10.

Class 23 DB

Class 23.10 
In the course of the changeover to computerised numbers the Class 23.10 became Class 35.10.

Class 24 

The locomotives of the Class 24 were standard passenger train locomotives with the Deutsche Reichsbahn.

Class 34 

In Class 34 of the Deutsche Reichsbahn are grouped state railway, passenger train tender locomotives with an axle arrangement of 1'B.

Class 34.742-744 
Class B IX of the Royal Bavarian State Railways were the first express locomotives in Bavaria.

Class 35 

On the introduction of computerised numbering in 1970, the Deutsche Reichsbahn (GDR) grouped all its Class 23.10 steam engines into Class 35, renumbering them accordingly..

Class 38 

The Deutsche Reichsbahn grouped all the passenger train tender locomotives with two leading carrying axles and three coupled axles taken over from the state railways, into its Class 38.

Class 38.2–3 
The class 38.2–3 contained the Saxon XII H2.

Class 38.10–40 
The class 38.10–40 contained the Prussian P 8.

Class 39 

The Deutsche Reichsbahn arranged the tender-equipped passenger train locomotives of the Prussian state railways Class P 10 into DRG Class 39 .

Class 41 

The Class 41 were standard goods train locomotives with the Deutsche Reichsbahn. The computer numbers 042 were for DB locomotives of the Class 41 with oil-firing, but not grouped with Class 42.

Class 42 

The goods train locomotives of the Class 42 built from 1943 onwards were the second, heavy class of so-called war locomotives (Kriegslokomotiven) (KDL 2), intended for  duties on routes that were cleared for a higher axle load. Further locomotives were built and sold by LOFAG after the war.

Class 43 

The Class 43 was the second Reichsbahn locomotive class to be built on standard locomotive (Einheitslok) principles. These two-cylinder locomotives were delivered by Henschel and Schwartzkopff. Several DB Class 44 locomotives were also given computer numbers beginning with 043, but were not part of DRG Class 43.

Class 44 

The Class 44 were standard goods train, steam locomotives with three cylinder engines. Both the DB and the East German DR converted some of the engines to oil-firing, the DB ones being recognisable from their 043 computerised numbers. 20 DR locomotives were fitted with the Wendler coal-dust firing system. Several DR locomotives were used as heating engines after being reconverted from oil to coal, but were not given 'coal numbers'; here the last known EDP running number is listed.

Class 45 

The Class 45 locomotives, built by the firm of Henschel between 1936 and 1937, were the most powerful, standard goods train locomotives in the Deutsche Reichsbahn.

Class 50 

The Deutsche Reichsbahn built more Class 50 standard, goods train locomotives than any other class of engine. A total of 3,164 were built between 1939 and 1948.

Class 50.35 
Between 1958 and 1962 the Deutsche Reichsbahn (GDR) had 208 locomotives of Class 50 fitted with newly designed boilers with a mixer-preheater, larger evaporative heating areas and improved suction draught. They were given the designation Class 50.35 and running numbers 50 3501 - 50 3708. Some time later, several locomotives of the series were also converted to oil-firing (BR 50.50) and renumbered to DR "50 00xx-x".

Class 50.40 
The 88 goods train locomotives of Class 50.40 of the Deutsche Reichsbahn (GDR) were a new design in  parallel with the DR Class 23.10 passenger train locomotives.

Class 50.50 
Between 1966 and 1971, 72 Class 50.35 engines were given oil-firing by the Deutsche Reichsbahn in East Germany. To distinguish them they were grouped into a new class, Class 50.50. On the introduction of the EDP numbers in 1970 they were given running numbers 50 0001 - 50 0072.

Class 52 

The DRG Class 52 was the most numerous of the so-called Kriegslokomotiven, with more than 6,700 units being produced.

Class 52.80 
The DR Class 52.80 was a series (52 8001 - 52 8200) of Rekoloks constructed from the Deutsche Reichsbahn’s fleet of Class 52s in East Germany. They were converted from the old stock in a similar manner to the  Class 50.35 around 1960 and fitted with more powerful  boilers.

Class 52.90 
In the early 1950s, 25 DRB Class 52 locomotives were converted to Wendler brown coal firing at RAW Stendal. On the introduction of the computerised numbers they were grouped into sub-class 52.90.

Class 55 

The Deutsche Reichsbahn grouped all ex-state railway, eight-coupled, goods train, tender locomotives with no carrying wheels into their Class 55.

Class 55.0-6 
The Prussian Class G 7.1 engines were built from 1893 by the firm of Stettiner Maschinenbau AG Vulcan. They were equipped with the same boiler as that of the Prussian G 5.

Class 55.16-22 
Class 55.16-22 comprised the Prussian G 8 locomotives built between 1902 and 1913 by various manufacturers. They were the first superheated, goods train locomotives in Prussia.

Class 55.25-58 
The Class 55.25-58 were the former Prussian G 8.1 locomotives built between 1913 and 1921, a stronger and heavier evolutionary development of the Prussian G 8, that was initially classed as a "strengthened standard class".

Class 56 

The Deutsche Reichsbahn incorporated the state railway, goods train, tender locomotives with one leading axle and four coupled axles into Class 56.

Class 56.30 
The Prussian G 8.2 is a variant of the Prussian G 8.3 with two cylinders. The Reichsbahn gave running numbers 56 3001 - 56 3008 to those of the Lübeck-Büchen Railway, which were also used on passenger train duties.

Class 57 

The DRG Class 57 encompassed various ex-state railway, goods train, tender locomotives with E axle arrangements.

Class 57.10-35 
The Reichsbahn allocated running numbers 57 1001 - 57 3524 to the Prussian T 16 and also the G 10 which had evolved from the Prussian P 8.

Class 58 

The DRG's Class 58 includes various ex-state railway, goods train, tender locomotives with an axle arrangement of 1'E (Decapod). Because they were used by almost all the Länderbahn railway administrations (except Bavaria), they are often described as the first German Einheitslokomotiven, despite oft-repeated comments to the contrary.

Class 58.2-3 
The Baden G 12 of the Royal Württemberg State Railways was based on the Prussian G 12.1 and a goods train locomotive class with a 1'E axle arrangement built by Henschel for the Royal Ottoman General Division of Military Railways (Kaiserlich Ottomanische Generaldirektion of the Militäreisenbahnen or C.F.O.A.).

Class 58.10-21 
The Prussian G 12 was built for the Prussian state railways and was based on the Prussian G 12.1 and a goods train, locomotive with a 1'E axle arrangement built by Henschel for the Royal Ottoman General Division of Military Railways (Kaiserlich Ottomanische Generaldirektion of the Militäreisenbahnen or C.F.O.A.).

Class 58.30 
Between 1956 and 1963, the Deutsche Reichsbahn (GDR) had 56 Class 58 locomotives fitted with a new-design boiler. These Rekoloks were reclassified as DR Class 58.30.

Class 62 

The 15 two-cylinder, superheated locomotives of DRG Class 62 were developed by the firm of Henschel as standard, passenger train, tank locomotives for the Deutsche Reichsbahn in the 1920s.

Class 64 

The DRG Class 64 was a standard, passenger train tank locomotive with a load axle load and a 1'C1' axle arrangement, affectionately known as the Bubikopf (German for the 1920s style 'bob' haircut).

Class 65 

The Class 65s were passenger train, tank locomotives with the Deutsche Bundesbahn and East German Deutsche Reichsbahn.

Class 65.10 
Like the DB Class 65, the DR Class 65.10 were intended for commuter traffic on suburban railway lines. The Deutsche Reichsbahn bought a total of 88 engines of this class.

Class 66 

The DB Class 66 was planned by the Deutsche Bundesbahn for fast freight and passenger train services on main and branch lines. These Neubaulokomotiven were intended to replace Länderbahn passenger train tank locomotives like the Class 38.10, 78 and 93 and were the penultimate locomotive series built as part of the DB's Neubau programme of newly designed engines.

Class 70 

The DRG's Class 70 incorporated all passenger train, tank locomotives with a 1B axle arrangement:

Class 70.0 
These two-cylinder, superheated Bavarian Pt 2/3 engines were manufactured by Krauss for the Royal Bavarian State Railways between 1909 and 1915 and allocated to DRG Class 70.0.

Class 74 

The DRG's Class 74 incorporated the Prussian T 11, Prussian T 12 and T 10 passenger train tank locomotives of the LBE with a 1'C axle arrangement.

Class 74.0-3 
The Class T 11 was a passenger train, tank locomotive built for the Prussian state railways

Class 74.4-13 
The Class T 12 was a passenger train tank locomotive produced for the Prussian state railways in large numbers. In 1925 the Reichsbahn took over 899 examples of this superheated derivative of the T 11 as Class 74.4-13 numbering them as 74 401 - 74 1300 with the exception of 74 544.

Class 75 

The DRG Class 75 swept up ex-state railway, passenger train, tank locomotives with an axle arrangement of 1'C1'. They were divided into sub-classes: 75.0 for the Württemberg T 5, 75.1-3 for the Baden VI b, 75.4,10-11 for the Baden VI c, 75.5 for the Saxon XIV HT and 75.6 for BLE Nos. 45 - 49, ELE Nos. 11 - 14 and other private railway locomotives taken over by the Reichsbahn.

Class 75.5 
In 1925 the Deutsche Reichsbahn arranged the six-coupled Saxon XIV HT tank locomotives from the Royal Saxon State Railways into Class 75.5.

Class 75.6 
In Class 75.6 were BLE Nos. 45 - 49, ELE Nos. 11 - 14 and other private railway locomotives taken over by the Reichsbahn.

Class 75.10-11 
The Baden VI c was an evolutionary development of the Baden VI b and was delivered by the Maschinenbau-Gesellschaft Karlsruhe from 1914 onwards to the Grand Duchy of Baden State Railway. The Class 75.10-11 includes the heavier, frame-strengthened engines from the last two series.

Class 78 

Class 78 are DB and DR tank locomotives with an axle arrangement of 2'C2'.

Class 78.0-5 
Class 78.0-5 incorporates the former Prussian and Württemberg T 18 locomotives.

Class 80 

The 39 tank engines of DRG Class 80 emerged between 1927 and 1928 as standard, shunting locomotives for the Deutsche Reichsbahn. They were built in the locomotive works of Jung in Jungenthal, Union in Königsberg, Wolf and Hohenzollern.

Class 81 

These Hanomag-built locomotives of Class 81 were standard goods train tank engines with the Deutsche Reichsbahn with a Dh2t axle formula.

Class 82 

The DB Class 82 was a so-called Neubaudampflokomotive built by the Deutsche Bundesbahn for shunting and freight services. It was a tank engine with the axle formula E, built in 1950 and 1951 by the firms of Krupp and Henschel, and in 1955 by the Maschinenfabrik Esslingen.

Class 85 

The DRG Class 85 was a goods train tank engine and Einheitslokomotive built for the Deutsche Reichsbahn.

Class 86 

The DRG Class 86 was a standard, goods train, tank locomotive with the Deutsche Reichsbahn with a 1'D1' axle arrangement. It was built by almost every firm that supplied the Reichsbahn.

Class 89 

The DRG Class 89 was for tank locomotives with a C axle arrangement.

Class 89.0 
The Class 89.0 was the smallest Einheitslokomotive in the Deutsche Reichsbahn.

Class 89.3-4 
The Württemberg T 3 of the Royal Württemberg State Railways were goods train tank engines with three coupled axles and no carrying axles.

Class 89.8 
The R 3/3 of the Royal Bavarian State Railways were goods train tank engines with three coupled axles and no carrying axles.

Class 89.9 
The Deutsche Reichsbahn arranged former private railway vehicles into Class 89.9.

Class 89.10 
DRG Class 89.10 were former Prussian T 8. steam locomotives.

Class 89.59-66 
DRG Class 89.59-66 grouped together the former private railways engines.

Class 89.70-75 
The Prussian T 3 locomotives of the Prussian state railways were  six-coupled, tank locomotives with no carrying wheels. The Deutsche Reichsbahn took over 511 of them in 1925 as DRG Class 89.70-75.

Class 90 

The Deutsche Reichsbahn grouped several variants of the T 9 steam locomotives from the Prussian state railways as Class 90.

Class 90.1 
The Prussian state railways' T 9.1 engines were goods train tank locomotives with an axle arrangement of C1'.

Class 91 

Several steam locomotives of the Prussian state railways' T 9 class were incorporated into DRG Class 91.

Class 92 

DRG Class 92 includes various passenger train tank locomotives with the axle formula D.

Class 92.5-10 
The Prussian T 13 was built by several manufacturers for the Prussian state railways, Imperial Railways in Alsace-Lorraine and Grand Duchy of Oldenburg State Railways. They were mainly employed on shunting duties.

Class 93 

DRG Class 93 incorporated tank locomotives with an axle arrangement of 1'D1'.

Class 93.0-4 
The Prussian state railways' T 14 were goods train tank engines.

Class 93.5-12 
The Prussian T 14.1s were goods train tank engines with a 1'D1' axle arrangement, which had a higher axle load on the rear carrying axle compared with the T14.

Class 94 

Tank locomotives with an E axle arrangement were grouped by the Deutsche Reichsbahn into Class 94.

Class 94.2-4 
DRG Class 94.2-4 comprised the T16 of the Prussian state railways, a goods train tank engine with an axle arrangement of E.

Class 94.5-17 
The T16.1 engines of the Prussian state railways were goods train tank engines. They were incorporated by the Deutsche Reichsbahn into DRG Class 94.5-17 .

Class 94.19-21 
The Saxon XI HT of the Royal Saxon State Railways were goods train tank engines. They were allocated by the Deutsche Reichsbahn to DRG Class 94.19-21.

Class 95 

Class 95 incorporates tank locomotives of the Deutsche Reichsbahn and its successor administrations that have an axle arrangement of 1'E 1'.

Class 95.0 
The Class 95.0 was a ten-coupled tank locomotive with an axle arrangement of 1'E1'. It was procured by the Deutsche Reichsbahn in 1922 for heavy goods train duties on steep main line routes. Because the development of this class was begun by the Prussian state railways, it was designated as the "T 20".

Class 95.66 
The Class 95.66 was a ten-coupled tank locomotive with an axle arrangement of 1'E1', which the Halberstadt-Blankenburger Eisenbahn procured in 1920 for duties on steep routes as a replacement for rack railway locomotives. The series, comprising 4 locomotives, was the technical precursor of the Prussian T 20, later DRG Class 95.0.

Class 97 

Rack railway steam locomotives were incorporated by the Deutsche Reichsbahn into Class 97.

Class 97.5 
The Württemberg Hz were rack railway locomotives, that were developed by the Royal Württemberg State Railways, but not delivered until it had been merged into the Deutsche Reichsbahn, who reclassified them as Class 97.5 in their numbering plan.

Class 98 

Class 98 groups all branch line and other remaining locomotives of the Deutsche Reichsbahn.

Class 98.3 
The locomotives of the Bavarian Class PtL 2/2 with the Royal Bavarian State Railways were light and very compact superheated locomotives for operations on Lokalbahnen. There were three series, of which two were classified as Class 98.3 in the Deutsche Reichsbahn and even survived into the Deutsche Bundesbahn era.

Class 98.7 
The Bavarian BB II were saturated, steam locomotives with the Royal Bavarian State Railways. They were Mallet locomotives.

Class 98.8 
The locomotives of the Class Bavarian Class GtL 4/4 were superheated tank locomotives with the Royal Bavarian State Railways intended for the duties on Lokalbahnen.

Class 98.70 
The Saxon Class VII T engines of the Royal Saxon State Railways were all four-coupled tank locomotives with no carrying wheels. To distinguish the manufacturer a preceding letter was added to the locomotive class, so H VII T meant locomotives built by Hartmann

Class 99 

The DRG Class 99 were steam locomotives for narrow gauge routes and were grouped according to their rail gauge.

1000 mm 
 is the most widely used gauge on narrow gauge railways and tramways in Germany.

900 mm 
900mm gauge track is only in use in Germany on the narrow gauge railways of Bäderbahn Molli and the Borkumer Kleinbahn.

750 mm

600  mm 

Locomotives with no class number

ELNA 
ELNA stands for Engerer Lokomotiv-Normen-Ausschuß (Enger Locomotive Standards Committee). After the First World War it developed 6 locomotive classes for various duties because many branch line and private railways were forced to modernise their obsolete engine fleets.

Standard gauge / 1435 mm

Industrial locomotives 

Due to their very specialised construction, industrial locomotives are only sorted by location.

1000 mm

750 mm

Locomotives of foreign classes 

Locomotives of foreign classes, which were not included in the existing numbering scheme.

1524/1520 mm ( Russian broad gauge)

1435 mm

1000mm 
A rack railway steam locomotive from the Austrian Schafbergbahn on loan to the Freilassing Locomotive World.

760  mm 
There are several industrial locomotives of Austrian origin and forest railway locomotives from Romania in 760mm gauge at various German railways or collections, including the German Museum of Technology (Berlin), or in a Wild West Park. Several former 760mm gauge locomotives from Austria run today on German 750mm tracks.

610  mm 

State railway locomotives of foreign origin.

600  mm 

See also 
 List of DRG locomotives and railcars

References

Sources 
 Bernhard Uhle (Hrsg.): Kursbuch der deutsche Museums-Eisenbahnen 2007. Verlag Uhle & Kleimann, Lübbecke 2007.